Synod on the Family may refer to:

The Fifth Ordinary General Assembly of the Synod of Bishops (1980)
The Third Extraordinary General Assembly of the Synod of Bishops (2014)
The Fourteenth Ordinary General Assembly of the Synod of Bishops (2015)